Sharp-Shooting Twin Sisters, aka A Woman for Ringo or Two Guns for Two Twins or Vengeance Ranch ( and ) is a 1966 Spanish-Italian film shot in Almeria, Andalucia, Spain.
It stars Sean Flynn and Pilar and Emilia Bayona.

Plot
Twin sisters, Jenny and Sally travel the American Old West with their grandfather and his medicine show. [In the Italian version, the girls are traveling with their uncle.] They sing and dance and show off their horse riding and sharp-shooting skills. Their grandfather has a bit of a gambling problem. It causes his demise when he is accidentally and fatally shot during a poker game, but he was left holding the winning hand. Thus the twins inherit the ranch their grandfather had won. Some bad hombres want to take the ranch away from the girls. Jimmy (In the Italian dubbed version Jimmy is known as Ringo) and Robert are two good guys who come to the aid of the twins.

Cast 
 Pilar Bayona as Jenny Parker
 Emilia Bayona as Sally Parker
 Sean Flynn as Jimmy/Ringo Slattery
 Jorge Rigaud as Trevor Slattery
 Beni Deus as Monahan
 Rogelio Madrid as Robert Clark
 Renato Baldini as Farrell
 Eva Guerr as Maggie
 Luis Induni as a Sheriff
 José Sepúlveda
 Giacomo Furia
 José Orjas as the grandpa/uncle
 Ricardo Rodríguez as a bandit
 Mario Morales as Ayudante del ferrocarril
 Guillermo Méndez as a bandit
 Gonzalo Esquiroz as a bandit
 José Uria
 Juan Maján
 Rossella Bergamonti
 María Bárbara
 Dolores Guerrero
 William Conroy as a Cowboy
 Álvaro Marenco as a Cowboy

Production
Filming was shot on location in Tabernas, Almeria, Andalucia, Spain using the same sets used by the Clint Eastwood film "For a Few Dollars More". 
The film was a Spanish/Italian co-production. In the Spanish language dubbed version released under the title of "Dos Pistolas Gemelas", 
Sean's character is known as Jimmy Slattery and the twins were traveling with their grandfather. In the Italian language prints released 
under the title, "Una Donna per Ringo", Sean's character is known as Ringo and the twins travel with their uncle. The twins Pili y Mili are listed as Milly and Philys in the Italian language prints.

References

External links

1966 films
Spanish Western (genre) films
1966 Western (genre) films
Films directed by Rafael Romero Marchent
Italian Western (genre) films
1960s Spanish-language films
Films shot in Madrid
Films shot in Almería
1960s Spanish films
1960s Italian films